Gideon Obeng Kyeremeh (born 14 December 2003) is a Ghanaian footballer who currently plays as a forward for Ghana Premier League side BA Stars.

Club career
Obeng Kyeremeh became the youngest player to ever feature in the Ghana Premier League when he made his debut on 6 November 2017 against Berekum Chelsea, aged 13 years, 10 months and 22 days.

Career statistics

Club

Notes

References

2003 births
Living people
Ghanaian footballers
Association football forwards
Ghana Premier League players
Aduana Stars F.C. players
Berekum Chelsea F.C. players
BA Stars F.C. players